Lee Kouadio (born October 27, 1987) is an Ivorian former footballer who played for Pittsburgh Riverhounds in the USL Second Division.

Career

College and Amateur
Kouadio-Tobey moved from his native Côte d'Ivoire to the United States as a teenager, settling in Woodlyn, Pennsylvania. He played four years of college soccer at the University of Vermont, where he was named America East Striker of the Year and Rookie of the Year in his freshman year.

During his college years he also played with the Cape Cod Crusaders in the USL Premier Development League.

Professional
After briefly trialling with the Philadelphia Union and the NSC Minnesota Stars during the early part of 2010, during which he played in several pre-season scrimmages, Kouadio-Tobey signed with the Pittsburgh Riverhounds of the USL Second Division. He made his professional debut on May 14, 2010 in a game against the Charlotte Eagles. In 2013, Kouadio spent the season with Apollon Kalamarias FC, making six appearances.

Coaching
In 2016, Kouadio joined the coaching staff at Central Arkansas as an assistant coach.

Personal
Kouadio-Tobey became a naturalized United States citizen on September 17, 2009.

References

1987 births
Living people
Ivorian footballers
Vermont Catamounts men's soccer players
Cape Cod Crusaders players
Pittsburgh Riverhounds SC players
USL League Two players
USL Second Division players
Association football forwards
Central Arkansas Bears soccer coaches